Brigadier Davis Evan Bedford  (1898–1978) was a British physician and cardiologist.

After education at Ipswich School and at Epsom College, D. Evan Bedford entered the Middlesex Hospital Medical School in 1916. In 1918 he became a surgeon sub-lieutenant in the Royal Naval Volunteer Reserve (RNVR) and in 1919 resumed his medical training, graduating in 1921 MB BS (Lond.) and qualifying MRCS, LRCP. After resident appointments at the Middlesex Hospital, he was appointed medical officer in charge of the cardiac wards at the Orpington Hospital belonging to the Ministry of Pensions. In 1925 he graduated MD. At the Orpington Hospital, he was influenced by John Parkinson and in 1925–1926 pursued postgraduate study in France.

Returning from France, Bedford in 1926 was appointed Paterson Research Scholar at the London Hospital and assistant physician to the Middlesex Hospital. At the Cardiac Club he became a member in 1928 and was the Club's secretary from 1932 to 1936. In 1931 he was elected FRCP. In 1933 he was appointed physician to outpatients at the National Heart Hospital. With J. Maurice Campbell, Bedford was the co-editor of the British Heart Journal from 1939 to 1947 when he resigned.

During the war, he kept a detailed diary, chronicling notable events such as his treatment of Winston Churchill, who became ill while visiting Tunis.

When WWII ended, D. Evan Bedford resumed his appointments at the Middlesex Hospital and the National Heart Hospital and established a large private practice in cardiology. In the post WWII era, cardiac catherisation and angiocardiography helped to revolutionise cardiac surgery. Evan Bedford and William Somerville worked closely with cardiac surgeons such as Thomas Holmes Sellors and Russell Brock.

Bedford was appointed in 1946 the Bradshaw Lecturer, in 1960 the Lumleian Lecturer, and in 1968 the Harveian Orator. He was president from 1960 to 1964 of the British Cardiac Society and was in 1963 appointed CBE. He was intimately familiar with the history of cardiology and often quoted from memory such sources as Rokitansky’s Die Defecte der Scheidewande des Herzens, Lower’s Tractatus de Corde, or the writings of the Irish Victorians, Adams, Stokes and Corrigan.

He collected a private library of over 1000 books which he donated in 1971 to the Royal College of Physicians. According to Peter Robert Fleming, the Bedford collection is an indispensable and comprehensive resource for historians of cardiology.

In 1935 in Marylebone, London, he married Audrey Selina Ely (b. 1902), daughter of Milton Victor Ely (b. 1873), chair of the Board of Governors of the National Heart Hospital. Evan and Audrey Bedford had two sons.

Selected publications

References

1898 births
1978 deaths
People educated at Ipswich School
People educated at Epsom College
Physicians of the Middlesex Hospital
20th-century English medical doctors
British cardiologists
Commanders of the Order of the British Empire
Fellows of the Royal College of Physicians
Royal Army Medical Corps officers